MVD refers to the Ministry of Internal Affairs (Russia) or its predecessor Ministry of Internal Affairs (Soviet Union), from (Ministerstvo Vnutrennikh Del)

It may also refer to:

Medicine
 Mitral valve disease, also known as mitral regurgitation or mitral insufficiency
 Marburg virus disease, a disease of humans and other primates caused by marburgviruses
 Microvascular decompression, an operation to relieve the pain caused by trigeminal neuralgia

Organizations
 HC MVD, a Kontinental Hockey League ice hockey team, based Balashikha
 Memorial Van Damme, an annual athletics meeting in Brussels
 Mississippi Valley Division, a regional command of the U.S. Army Corps of Engineers
 Montevideo, the capital and chief port of Uruguay
 Carrasco International Airport (IATA: MVD), Uruguay's largest airport
 Motor Vehicle Division, the equivalent of the Department of Motor Vehicles in Arizona and New Mexico, United States
 Ministerstvo Vnutrennikh Del ("Ministry of Internal Affairs"); also sometimes used to refer to the equivalent ministries in the other former Soviet republics

Other uses
 MVD Entertainment Group (previously Music Video Distributors, Inc.), a company that releases and distributes music and entertainment
 Most Valuable Danette, an annual award presented on The Dan Patrick Show
 Multivalued dependency, in database theory, a full constraint between two sets of attributes in a relation